Indonesia is scheduled to compete at the 2022 Asian Games in Hangzhou. Originally scheduled to take place in 2022, the Games were postponed and rescheduled to 2023, due to the COVID-19 pandemic.

Competitors
The following is the list of number of competitors in the Games.

Equestrian 

Indonesian equestrian athlete, Ferry Wahyu Hadianto qualified for the 2022 Asian Games after winning a gold medal at the 2022 Asian Games Pre-Qualification at the Equinara Horse Sports arena, Pulomas, Jakarta in November 2021.
Jumping

Field hockey 

Summary

Men's tournament

The Indonesian men's field hockey team qualified for the Asian Games by reaching the Semifinals of the Asian Games Men's Field Hockey Qualifying Championship in Bangkok, Thailand.

Women's tournament

The Indonesian women's field hockey team qualified for the Asian Games by finishing fifth in the Asian Games Women's Field Hockey Qualifying Championship in Jakarta, Indonesia.

References

2022 Asian Games
Indonesia at the Asian Games

See also
Indonesia at the 2021 Southeast Asian Games
Indonesia at the 2020 Summer Olympics
Indonesia at the 2020 Summer Paralympics